Michel Sanchez is a name. People with that name include:
Michel Sanchez (born 1967), French footballer
Michel Sanchez (born 1957), French musician

Sanchez, Michel